The P'yŏngbuk Line is an electrified standard-gauge secondary trunk line of the Korean State Railway in North Pyŏngan Province, North Korea, running from Chŏngju on the P'yŏngŭi Line to Ch'ŏngsu; it meets the Ch'ŏngnyŏn P'arwŏn Line at Kusŏng, and at Ch'ŏngsu, via a bridge across the Yalu River, it goes to Shanghekou, China, where it connects to China Railway's Fengshang Railway to Fenghuangcheng.

History
The line was opened by the privately owned P'yŏngbuk Railway on 27 September 1939 as an industrial railway to serve the Sup'ung Hydroelectric Power Plant on the Yalu River. The Emperor of Manchukuo, Puyi, travelled along this line when he visited the Sup'ung Dam.

Following the partition of Korea the line was located within the Soviet zone of occupation, and was nationalised along with all the other railways in the zone by the Provisional People’s Committee for North Korea on 10 August 1946, becoming part of the Korean State Railway. Electrification of the entire line was completed in 1980, and at the same time, semi-automatic train control was installed on the  section between Chŏngju and Kusŏng.

Services
The line serves a variety of industries, including a textile factory in Kusŏng, a chemical factory in Ch'ŏngsu, and North Korea's largest lignite mine near P'ungnyŏn, as well as shipping large amounts of wood south from Amrokkang Station on the Yalu River. Other important commodities shipped on the line are limestone and anthracite.

There are two long-distance passenger trains that operate on the line - semi-express trains 115/116 between P'yŏngyang and Ch'ŏngsu, and local trains 200/201 between West P'yŏngyang and Ch'ŏngsu. There are also commuter trains along the Ch'ongsu—Sup'ung—P'ungnyŏn (6 pairs), Kusŏng—Paegun (5 pairs) and Chŏngju—Kusŏng (2 pairs) sections of the line.

Route
A yellow background in the "Distance" box indicates that section of the line is not electrified.

References

Railway lines in North Korea
Standard gauge railways in North Korea